was the third Hattori Hanzō and a retainer under the Tokugawa clan during the late Sengoku period of Japanese history. He was the eldest son of the famous Hattori Hanzō.

Masanari began to fight alongside his father by the mid 1590s, succeeding him in 1596 at age 31. Following the Battle of Sekigahara of 1600, Masanari was enlisted by Tokugawa Ieyasu as captain of the Edo Castle guards. The band of Iga placed under his command, however, rebelled in response to Masanari's treatment causing him to be utterly humiliated in the face of the Tokugawa. While tracking two members who had fled, he killed a man in what turned out to be a case of mistaken identity and was relieved of his position. In order to repair the Hattori name and his reputation, Masanari valiantly fought during the Siege of Osaka in 1614-1615 as head of 60 Iga ninja. He was cut down in the process of the second siege of Osaka, and was succeeded by his brother Hattori Masashige.

References

Samurai
Ninja
1565 births
1615 deaths
Hatamoto
Japanese warriors killed in battle